Milciades Bautista Adorno Aguero (born 27 January 2005) is a Paraguayan footballer who plays as a forward for Sportivo Ameliano, on loan from Club Guaraní.

Club career
Adorno scored his first senior goal in a 2–1 win over Resistencia in May 2022.

In September 2022, he was named by English newspaper The Guardian as one of the best players born in 2005 worldwide.

Personal life
His father, Líder Adorno, was also a footballer, and played in Paraguay.

Career statistics

Club

Notes

References

2005 births
Living people
Association football forwards
Paraguayan footballers
Paraguayan Primera División players
Club Guaraní players